Lieutenant General Raja Saroop Khan was a career Pakistan Army officer who served as the Governor of Punjab from 1995 to 1996.

Raja Saroop Khan was commissioned in the 7th PMA Long Course from Pakistan Military Academy in 1953. Later in his military career, he stayed as the Vice-Chief of General Staff (VCGS) at the GHQ, commanded an armoured division, and later served in the GHQ as Military Secretary (MS). He was promoted to lieutenant general in March 1984 and given the command of II Corps at Multan. After retiring from the army in March 1988, he started his political career.

Raja Saroop Khan died in Rawalpindi on 22 October 2020 due to natural causes.

External links

 

Living people
Pakistani generals
Governors of Punjab, Pakistan
Year of birth missing (living people)
People from Mirpur, Azad Kashmir
Government Gordon College alumni
Pakistan Military Academy alumni